Sam Kee LRT station is an elevated Light Rail Transit (LRT) station on the Punggol LRT line West Loop in Punggol, Singapore, along Sentul Crescent near Punggol Town Hub. The station's main entrance is directly opposite to the Punggol Waterway Park and the SAFRA Punggol clubhouse. It is located next to One Punggol which opened in 2022.

The station has a unique design compared to the other stations as it is the only station along the Punggol LRT line that is not built on a road median.

The name was derived from a former village in the station's surrounding area, which is located at the former Sam Kee area.

History

On 18 February 2016, SBS Transit announced that the station will be opened to provide access to the Punggol Waterway Park and SAFRA Punggol Clubhouse. The station opened on 29th of that month.

References

External links

Railway stations in Singapore opened in 2016
Punggol
LRT stations in Punggol
Railway stations in Punggol
Light Rail Transit (Singapore) stations